Miguel "Michael" Malizewski (also spelled Maliszewski) is an Argentine-American former soccer player.  He spent two seasons in the North American Soccer League and earned three caps with the U.S. national team.

Malizewski's first two national team games came against Israel in September 1968.  The first was a 3-3 tie and the second a 4-0 loss.  His last game with the U.S. national team was a 1-0 loss to Haiti in a World Cup qualification match.

Malizewski spent two seasons, 1968 and 1969, with the Baltimore Bays in the North American Soccer League.

References

External links
 FIFA player profile
 NASL stats

1948 births
Living people
American soccer players
Baltimore Bays players
North American Soccer League (1968–1984) players
United States men's international soccer players
Association football forwards
Association football midfielders
Argentine people of Polish descent
American people of Polish descent